, also known as South to the Horizon, is a 1986 Japanese film directed by Seiji Izumi.

Awards
8th Yokohama Film Festival
Won: Best Actor - Kōichi Iwaki
Won: Best Actress - Narumi Yasuda
Won: Best Cinematography

References

1986 films
Films directed by Seiji Izumi
1980s Japanese-language films
1980s Japanese films